Utebo Fútbol Club is a Spanish football team based in Utebo, in the autonomous community of Aragon. Founded in 1924 it plays in Segunda División RFEF – Group 2, holding home games at Estadio Santa Ana, with a capacity of 5,000 seats.

Season to season

1 season in Segunda División B
1 season in Segunda División RFEF
38 seasons in Tercera División
1 season in Tercera División RFEF

Honours
Tercera División: 2003–04

Famous players
 Cani
 Txiki
 Miguel Linares

References

External links
Official website 
Futbolme team profile 

Football clubs in Aragon
Association football clubs established in 1924
1924 establishments in Spain